Equal Pay Act can refer to:

 Equal Pay Act of 1963 in the USA
 Equal Pay Act 1970 in UK